Robert James Burke (January 23, 1907 – February 8, 1971) was a pitcher for the Washington Senators and Philadelphia Phillies.

Burke helped the Senators win the 1933 American League Pennant.

In 10 seasons Burke had a 38–46 win–loss record, appearing in 254 games, starting 88 of them, pitching 27 complete games, tossing 4 shutouts, finishing 93 games, earning 5 saves, 918 innings pitched, allowing 926 hits, allowing 506 runs (437 earned), surrendering 35 home runs, walking 360, striking our 299, hitting 24 batsmen, 16 wild pitches, facing 3,985 batters, 3 balks and a 4.28 ERA.

On August 8, 1931, while with the Senators, Burke no-hit the Boston Red Sox 5–0 at Griffith Stadium.  It was the last no-hitter by a Washington-area Major League Baseball team until Jordan Zimmermann on September 28, 2014.

Burke died on February 8, 1971, aged 64.

See also
 List of Major League Baseball no-hitters

References

External links

1907 births
1971 deaths
Baseball players from Illinois
Major League Baseball pitchers
Sportspeople from Joliet, Illinois
Philadelphia Phillies players
Washington Senators (1901–1960) players